Khovis (also Romanized as Khovīs, Khūveys, Khaveys, and Khoveyyes; also known as Meysām-e Tammār and Meys̄am-e Tammār) is a village in Shavur Rural District, Shavur District, Shush County, Khuzestan Province, Iran. At the 2006 census, its population was 3,451, in 459 families.

References 

Populated places in Shush County